The South Australian Aviation Museum, located in Port Adelaide, South Australia, is an aviation museum which displays aircraft, aircraft engines, and rockets of relevance to South Australia, and the history of aviation and the aerospace industry in Australia.

History 
The museum's origins can be traced to 1984 when it was started by a group of enthusiasts interested in aviation history and aircraft restoration. In 1990 it became the official aviation museum for South Australia when it was awarded Provisional Accreditation by the History Trust of South Australia. The following year it became responsible for the State's historical aviation collection.

In 1996 the museum became the home of the heritage rocket collection associated with the Woomera Test Range in the period 1950–1980. The heritage rocket collection is the property of the Defence Science and Technology Organisation.

Following several moves, the museum was set up at its present site in 2006. A second hangar was added in 2017 to accommodate the museum's growing collection of aircraft, engines and associated displays.

Collection

Aircraft on display

 Aero Commander 680 VH-PSG
 BAe 146-300 VH-NJL
 Bell OH-58A Kiowa A17-010
 CAC CA-30 A7-026
 Cessna CC-1 – replica
 GAF Mirage IIID A3-115
 de Havilland Canada DHC-4 Caribou A4-225
 de Havilland DH.60G Gipsy Moth 1074
 de Havilland DH.100 Vampire FB.31 A79-202
 de Havilland DH.112 Sea Venom FAW.53 WZ931
 Douglas C-47B Dakota A65-114
 English Electric Canberra B.2 WK165
 English Electric Canberra T.4 WD954
 Fokker F-27-109 Friendship VH-CAT
 GAF Jindivik N11-752 – target drone
 General Dynamics F-111C  A8-132
 Gloster Meteor F.8 A77-851 – cockpit
 Hall Cherokee II VH-GPR
 Lockheed AP-3C Orion A9-756
 Piper PA-24-250 Comanche VH-DOL
 Shepard CS2
 Supermarine Spitfire Vc A58-146
 Van's RV-4 VH-NOJ
 Westland Wessex HAS.31B N7-224

Engines on display

 Allison T56A-11A
 Allison T56A-14
 Armstrong Siddeley Cheetah IX
 Armstrong Siddeley Lynx V
 Blackburn Cirrus I
 Blackburne Tomtit
 de Havilland Gipsy Queen
 Gnome Monosoupape
 Hispano-Suiza 8
 Lycoming LF507-1H
 Lycoming O-540
 Packard Liberty L-12
 Packard V-1650
 Pratt & Whitney JT3D-3
 Pratt & Whitney R-985
 Pratt & Whitney R-1340-AN2 Wasp
 Pratt & Whitney R-2000
 Rolls-Royce Avon
 Rolls-Royce Derwent
 Rolls-Royce Kestrel
 Rolls-Royce Merlin III
 Rolls-Royce Nene
 Walter Minor 6-111
 Westinghouse J34
 Wittber engine

Aircraft under restoration 

 Aero 145 20-002
 Avro Anson I EF954/AW965
 Fairey Battle N2188
 SOCATA TB-10 Tobago 1407

See also 
List of aerospace museums

References

External links 

 South Australian Aviation Museum

Aerospace museums in Australia
Museums in Adelaide
Tourist attractions in South Australia